The Mailiao Power Plant is a coal-fired power plant in Formosa Mai-Liao Industrial Park, Mailiao Township, Yunlin County, Taiwan. With a total installed capacity of 4,200 MW, the plant is Taiwan's third largest coal-fired power plant after Taichung Power Plant and Hsinta Power Plant.

History
The groundbreaking ceremony for the power plant construction was held on 12 December 1996. Invited to the ceremony were Vice Premier Hsu Li-teh, Minister of Economic Affairs Wang Chih-kang and President of Legislative Yuan Liu Sung-pan.

Commissioned in June 1999 for its first two units, the power plant is the first independent power producer power plant after Taipower ended the electricity supply monopoly in Taiwan in 1994.

Architecture
The power plant is located on a 87 hectares of area made of reclaimed land.

Ownership
The power plant is owned by the Mai-Liao Power Corporation (MPC) and Formosa Petrochemical Corporation (FPCC).

Generation units
The power plant consists of five 600 MW pulverized coal-fired units owned by the MPC and two 600 MW pulverized coal-fired co-generation units owned by the FPCC. The plant is designed for base load service with the capability for daily startup and shutdown operation per instructions from Taipower's dispatcher center.

Components
The coal handling system of the power plant has a truck unloading station capacity of 600 tonnes/hour and its flexible sidewall conveyor capacity of 800 tonnes/hour. It gets its coal directly from cargo ships docking at its Mai-Liao Industrial Port, next to the power plant. The coal is stored in coal domes in which each dome is 120 meter in diameter, 60 meter in height and 180,000 tons in capacity. The cooling system for the plant comes directly from the sea water with a total usage amount of 200,000 tons per day.

Events

2012
On 20 June 2012 at 11:55 am, the power plant tripped during the Tropical Storm Talim. This caused the shut down of 54 out of 66 units of the Yunlin petrochemical complex.

2016
On 1 August 2016, a generating unit of the power plant broke down, disrupting the supply of power.

2017
On 7 October 2017, the no. 1 generation unit of the power plant was shut down due to pipe rupture, causing 600 MW of power loss.

See also

 List of power stations in Taiwan
 List of coal power stations
 Electricity sector in Taiwan

References

1999 establishments in Taiwan
Buildings and structures in Yunlin County
Coal-fired power stations in Taiwan
Energy infrastructure completed in 1999